Cameron M. Alexander (February 12, 1932 – December 30, 2018) was an American Baptist minister. He was the leader of the 12,000-member Antioch Baptist Church North and community leader in the English Avenue neighborhood (also known as part of "The Bluff") in Atlanta.

In October 2010, Kennedy Street in English Avenue was renamed Cameron M. Alexander Blvd. in his honor.

Rev. Alexander died on December 30, 2018, at age 86.

References

External links
 Biography of Alexander on pp. 2–3 of City of Atlanta online

1932 births
2018 deaths
20th-century American clergy
Baptist ministers from the United States
People from Atlanta